Ingemund Fænn (18 September 1907 – 19 June 1987) was a Norwegian newspaper editor.

He was born in Stryn. He worked in Fjordingen from 1928 to 1936, and was hired in Bergens Tidende in 1936. He advanced to head of its Oslo office in 1946, and was editor-in-chief from 1956 to 1977.

References

1907 births
1987 deaths
People from Stryn
Norwegian newspaper editors
20th-century Norwegian writers
Bergens Tidende editors